In biological classification, a species inquirenda is a species of doubtful identity requiring further investigation. The use of the term in English-language biological literature dates back to at least the early nineteenth century.

The term taxon inquirendum is broader in meaning and refers to an incompletely defined taxon of which the taxonomic validity is uncertain or disputed by different experts or is impossible to identify the taxon. Further characterization is required.

See also
 Glossary of scientific naming
 Candidatus, a proposed taxa based on incomplete evidence
 incertae sedis, a taxon of uncertain position in a classification
 nomen dubium, a name of unknown or doubtful application
 Open nomenclature, a system of notations used in taxonomy to indicate a taxonomist's judgement about taxon affinities

References

Latin biological phrases
Species